Linda Laughlin McIntosh (born December 14, 1943) is a former politician in Manitoba, Canada. She was a member of the Legislative Assembly of Manitoba from 1990 to 1999, and a cabinet minister for most of this period. Among other awards and recognitions, McIntosh has received both the Queen Elizabeth II Golden Jubilee Medal and the Queen Elizabeth II Diamond Jubilee Medal, for her contributions to Canada.

Early life 
McIntosh was born in Montreal, Quebec. She’s the daughter of Hugh Laughlin a career military officer (RCAF) and Gwen Ruth Hopper. She was educated in Canada and Europe, attending eleven different schools during the course of her elementary and high school education.  In 1960 she graduated from Royal George High School in Greenfield Park, Quebec and moved to Manitoba (the province in which her parents were raised and to which they eventually retired) and began studies at St. John's College, University of Manitoba. McIntosh graduated with honors from the Manitoba Teachers' College in 1963.

Personal life
In 1988, She married Donald John McIntosh. McIntosh’s nephew Hugh McFadyen, is the former Leader of the Opposition in Manitoba, her grandfather John Bell Laughlin and her great grandfather Andrew Laughlin were also MLA’s in south western Manitoba.

Career

Teacher, artist/illustrator, TV Commentator, School Board, Civil Service 

McIntosh worked as an elementary school teacher and freelance commercial artist for several years, and was also a political commentator on CBC TV's Friday Night News "Week In Review" segment in 1985-86. She was the weekly cartoonist/illustrator for local Winnipeg Community Newspapers and the province wide Rupertsland News. She enjoyed a brief stint as an illustrator the Winnipeg Tribune prior to its untimely demise in 1980.

McIntosh was elected as a school trustee in the Winnipeg region of St. James-Assiniboia in 1980, and served until 1989, becoming its first female chair in 1984. She was elected to serve as president of the Manitoba Association of School Trustees in the mid-eighties.
In June 1988, she was hired as Special Assistant to Progressive Conservative leader Gary Filmon, who had become Manitoba's Premier the previous month.

Legislature 

McIntosh was herself elected to the Manitoba legislature in the provincial election of 1990, defeating incumbent Liberal Ed Mandrake by 1324 votes in the western Winnipeg riding of Assiniboia.

On February 5, 1991, she was named Minister of Cooperative, Consumer and Corporate Affairs, with responsibility for the Liquor Control Act. In those roles she had the Residential Tenancy Act re-written and established a Residential Tenancy Court which enabled landlords and tenants with disputes to have their issues resolved quickly and inexpensively without lengthy civil court battles.

McIntosh was appointed to the Manitoba Provincial Treasury Board on January 14, 1992 where she served for two years.

On September 10, 1993, she was transferred from Consumer and Corporate Affairs to the Ministry of Urban Affairs and Housing. In this portfolio she worked closely with then Winnipeg Mayor Susan Thompson on a wide variety of inter-provincial issues such as the Shoal Lake Aqueduct agreement and the Municipal/Provincial/Federal Infrastructure Agreements.

Her work in the Housing Department earned her public recognition from public housing tenants.  McIntosh was easily re-elected in the provincial election of 1995, defeating Liberal Allen Green by 1130 votes.  On May 9, 1995, she was appointed Minister of Education and Training, responsible for K-12 education in public and independent schools and for post secondary education in universities, colleges and apprenticeship programs. As Minister of Education, she was responsible for developing measurable standards for literacy and numeracy at three-year intervals at grades 3, 6, 9, and 12. Mainly diagnostic in nature, these standards tests also counted for a portion of students' final marks at the upper levels of learning.

McIntosh felt that her most significant work was the undertaking of a two-year-long Special Needs Study, culminating in recommendations, widely praised, which recommended how to best meet the challenges and opportunities of inclusivism; and how to create the most enabling learning experience for all students, in regular and special needs categories.

As the minister responsible for all post-secondary education, she created the Council on Post-Secondary Education to be responsible for co-ordinating efforts amongst Manitoba's Universities and Colleges, to better avoid duplication and overlap, and to ensure seamless movement from one level of learning to another throughout the province.

It was under McIntosh's tenure that the Canadian Mennonite University was established, and that a Task Force was established and completed recommendations on what needed to be done to arrange better opportunities for Apprenticeship and Trades training.

She increased the student representation on the Universities' Boards of Governors and approved the University of Manitoba's Student Union's Pathways to Excellence brief to the provincial government. Under her Tenure the Red River Community College expanded and was granted new nomenclature, becoming Red River College. She also imposed a number of surcharges for certain university categories in 1995 and 1996, which were regarded by some as particularly severe on foreign students, since foreign students would no longer be given a preferential tuition rate and would have to pay the same fees as Canadian students.

McIntosh was no stranger to controversy. Amongst many items which became the topic of public debate during her tenure as Education Minister was the whole question of patriotic exercises in schools and the significance of the monarchy in Canada. In 1998, school principals brought to her attention that the portion of the Manitoba Schools Act concerning patriotic exercises was not being followed in many schools. McIntosh won the support of the Monarchists across the province, and the ire of Canadian republicans, when she sent out a memo to School Divisions reminding them that the Act was to be followed.

It became a provincial controversy, with many complaining that semestered school timetables made such exercises difficult to successfully accomplish since not all students would be present for them. In one memorable moment during this controversy, the entire opposition NDP caucus stood and with great gusto sang all the verses of God Save the Queen in the Legislative Assembly of Manitoba.

MLA Doug Martindale (NDP, Burrows) said afterwards that the performance was a "serenade" for Minister McIntosh. The Lieutenant-Governor of Manitoba, who was present in the House during this escapade, wisely stood silently at attention during the "serenade" and afterwards made no comment. 

In the final cabinet shuffle of Filmon's government on February 5, 1999, McIntosh was named Minister of Environment with responsibility for the Manitoba Public Insurance Corporation Act.

McIntosh was very narrowly defeated by New Democrat Jim Rondeau in the 1999 provincial election.  McIntosh actually led Rondeau on election night, but fell three votes behind when the institutional and absentee ballots were counted. McIntosh did not seek a return to office in 2003.

Other Career Experience 

In 1999 and 2000, McIntosh was Marketing Director for Winnipeg's Portsmouth Retirement Residence during its construction, development and start up, ensuring that accommodation was appropriate for prospective clients' needs.

From 2000-2003 McIntosh was president and owner of Roaming Buffalo Communications, a company specializing in speech-writing, brochure design, editing, communications consulting and the production of a magazine, {"The Roaming Buffalo Magazine"} highlighting Manitoba's people and places.

McIntosh was on the local Board of Drectors for the federal Canadian Alliance Party of Canada Canadian Alliance prior to its merger with the Progressive Conservative Party of Canada in 2003. She was a strong supporter of the "Unite The Right" movement which led to that merger. She subsequently was elected to the local Board of Directors for the new Conservative Party of Canada. During the federal election of 2004 McIntosh campaigned for successful Conservative candidates Steven Fletcher and Joy Smith.

McIntosh served as Constituency Assistant for M.P. Steven Fletcher from June 2004 to June 2005.

Author 

McIntosh is the author of three biographies of heroic Canadians.

Her first book, "What Do You Do If You Don't Die?," published by Heartland Associates of Manitoba in 2008, is the story of geological engineer and award winning athlete Steven Fletcher's struggle to return to a full life after becoming paralyzed from the neck down. An inspirational book, it has been praised by advocates for the catastrophically injured, the severely disabled, and those who are struggling to overcome adversity. Linda McIntosh and Steven Fletcher have been friends and confidants since the mid-nineties.

McIntosh's second book, "Child of Lamposaari", published in 2010, is the birth to death biography of Hilkka Nygard, the matriarch of the Nygard Fashion Empire, and a personal friend of McIntosh. The book has been praised by those who are interested in the history of Finland, in which much of the story takes place; and by those who are interested in the many challenges faced by Canadian immigrants. McIntosh has indicated that the book is a tribute, not just to Hilkka Nygard; but to all Canadian immigrant mothers, to the lands they loved and left behind and to the great country to which they came.

A third book, Master of My Fate, a continuation of Steven Fletcher's saga, was written in response to a request for "more" from readers of the first book about Fletcher. This book takes readers through Fletcher's life from 2006 to 2015 and details the many challenges and circumstances he had to overcome during that period. It deals extensively with Steven Fletcher's mission to legalize physician-assisted-death (PAD)in Canada. It includes stories and opinions from advocates and opponents of PAD and the text of the two Bills Fletcher introduced as an MP into the Canadian House of Commons on the topic. At the time of writing the Parliament of Canada had not acted upon the Canadian Supreme Court's order to develop PAD legislation. Hence the book became widely read, discussed and debated.

McIntosh is active as a community volunteer in her current locale in northwestern Ontario. She has been elected to the Board of Directors of the Mary Berglund Community Health Centre, serving the township of Ignace and surrounding area including Savant Lake; and to the Board of Directors, Conservative Party of Canada, Kenora, Ontario.

References 

1943 births
Living people
Anglophone Quebec people
Canadian people of Irish descent
Politicians from Montreal
Politicians from Winnipeg
Progressive Conservative Party of Manitoba MLAs
Women MLAs in Manitoba
Members of the Executive Council of Manitoba
Red River College alumni
Women government ministers of Canada